Salah El Din Ahmed Said (born 29 October 1988), also known as Salhadin Said or Saladin Said, is an Ethiopian professional footballer who plays as a forward for Ethiopian Premier League club  Sidama Coffee. His energy, skill, and goal scoring ability in critical games have made him one of the indispensable players in eastern Africa. Salhadin finished as the top scorer in the 2017 CAF Champions League.

Club career

Early career 
In 2010, Salhadin was on trial with Serbian club Partizan, but the transfer failed. Subsequently, he trialled with FK Vojvodina, but did not manage to go further than gaining good wishes and compliments from coach Zoran Milinković.

In 2011, Salhadin scored five goals in a 2011 Kagame Inter-Club Cup game against AS Port from Djibouti.

Wadi Gegla 
On 9 October 2011, Salhadin got transferred to Egyptian club Wadi Degla FC, who paid 2,040,000 Ethiopian birr, ($240,000 US), at the time the highest sum ever paid for an Ethiopian footballer.

Lierse
Salhadin said ahead of Ethiopia's game against Burkina Faso in 2013 Africa Cup of Nations that he was moving to Belgium club Lierse after the Africa Cup.

Al Ahly 
On 23 April 2014, Saladin moved from Wadi Degla to the league rivals Al-Ahly where they had captured 2013 CAF Champions League title.

Saint George 
After an unsuccessful stint at Algerian side MC Alger, Said returned to Saint George in 2016.

International career
Said debuted for the Ethiopia national team in 2005. Since then he has been Ethiopia's top scorer in 2014 FIFA World Cup qualification.

Career statistics
Scores and results list Ethiopia's goal tally first, score column indicates score after each Said goal.

References

External links 
 
 

Living people
1988 births
Sportspeople from Benishangul-Gumuz Region
Ethiopian footballers
Association football forwards
Ethiopia international footballers
2013 Africa Cup of Nations players
Ethiopian Premier League players
Egyptian Premier League players
Belgian Pro League players
Algerian Ligue Professionnelle 1 players
Wadi Degla SC players
Al Ahly SC players
Lierse S.K. players
MC Alger players
Ethiopian expatriate footballers
Ethiopian expatriate sportspeople in Egypt
Expatriate footballers in Egypt
Ethiopian expatriate sportspeople in Belgium
Expatriate footballers in Belgium
Ethiopian expatriate sportspeople in Algeria
Expatriate footballers in Algeria